Marino Šarlija (born January 13, 1989) is a Croatian professional basketball player who currently plays for the Sonik-Puntamika of the Croatian League. He is a son of the former basketball player Stipe Šarlija.

External links
 Profile at realgm.com
 Profile at euroleague.net
 Profile at eurobasket.com

1989 births
Living people
Croatian men's basketball players
KK Zadar players
KK Zagreb players
KK Zabok players
PVSK Panthers players
Basketball players from Zagreb
Centers (basketball)
Power forwards (basketball)
KK Borik Puntamika players
BSC Fürstenfeld Panthers players
Kapfenberg Bulls players